The 2014 Minnesota Attorney General election was held on November 4, 2014, to elect the Minnesota Attorney General.

Incumbent Democratic–Farmer–Labor Attorney General Lori Swanson ran for re-election to a third term in office. Primary elections were held on August 12, 2014. The Democratic–Farmer–Labor Party (DFL) renominated Swanson, the Republican Party nominated State Senator Scott Newman and the Independence Party nominated attorney Brandan Borgos.

Swanson defeated Newman in the general election by a significant margin.

Democratic–Farmer–Labor primary
The Democratic–Farmer–Labor endorsement was made on May 31, 2014. Incumbent Lori Swanson won the endorsement unopposed.

Candidates

Nominee
 Lori Swanson, incumbent attorney general (party endorsed)

Results

Republican primary
The Republican endorsement was made on May 30, 2014. State Senator Scott Newman won the endorsement unopposed.

Candidates

 Sharon Anderson, perennial candidate
 Scott Newman (party endorsed), state senator

Results

Independence nomination
The Independence Party endorsement was made on May 17, 2014. Brandan Borgos won the endorsement unopposed.

Candidates

Nominee
 Brandan Borgos, attorney (party endorsed)

Results

General election

Candidates
 Lori Swanson (DFL), incumbent attorney general
 Scott Newman (Republican), state senator
 Brandan Borgos (Independence), state senator
 Mary O'Connor (Libertarian)
  Andy Dawkins (Green), former DFL state representative
 Dan Vacek (Independent, political principle: Legal Marijuana Now)

Polling

Results

See also
 Minnesota elections, 2014

References

External links
 Elections & Voting - Minnesota Secretary of State

Attorney General
Minnesota Attorney General elections
Minnesota